Anton Csorich (1795–1864) was a Croatian nobleman and general in the Habsburg monarchy imperial army service. He was titled baron of Monte Creto and promoted to the position of lieutenant field marshal when he became the second chief of the 15th Infantry Regiment.  In that position he took part in the suppression of the October 1848 uprising in Vienna.  He then went on to participate in the Austrian war against the Hungarian State in 1849.

He was also a holder of the Knight's Cross of the Military Order of Maria Theresa.

See also
 List of Military Order of Maria Theresa recipients of Croatian descent
 Croatian nobility
 Adam Bajalics
 Franjo Vlašić
 Paul Davidovich
 Andreas Karaczay

References

Sources
 

1795 births
1864 deaths
Croatian military personnel in Austrian armies
People from Karlovac
Barons of Croatia
Austrian generals
18th-century Croatian nobility
19th-century Croatian nobility
People of the Military Frontier
19th-century Croatian people
19th-century Croatian military personnel